William Herbert Maundrell (5 November 1876 – 17 June 1958) was a Japanese-born English cricketer who played for Hampshire. He was born in Nagasaki and died in Middle Deal.

Maundrell made a single first-class appearance for the team, during the 1900 County Championship, against Derbyshire. From the middle order, he scored a duck in the only innings in which he batted.

Nine years later, Maundrell represented Hong Kong in two Interport matches.

External links
William Maundrell at Cricket Archive

1876 births
1958 deaths
People from Nagasaki
English cricketers
Hampshire cricketers